, literally West Ibaraki, was a district located in Ibaraki Prefecture, Japan.

As of 2004, the district had an estimated population of 52,291. The total area was 108.64 km2.

There were two municipalities before the dissolution:
 Iwama
 Tomobe

On March 19, 2006, the towns of Iwama and Tomobe were merged into the expanded city of Kasama. Therefore, Nishiibaraki District was dissolved as a result of this merger.

District Timeline
 February 15, 1958 - The town of Kasama gained city status.
 February 1, 2005 - The village of Nanakai was merged with the town of Jōhoku, and village of Katsura (both from Higashiibaraki District), to create the town of Shirosato (in Higashiibaraki District).
 October 1, 2005 - The town of Iwase was merged with the town of Makabe, and the village of Yamato (both from Makabe District) to create the city of Sakuragawa.
 March 19, 2006 - The towns of Iwama and Tomobe were merged into the expanded city of Kasama. Therefore, Nishiibaraki District was dissolved as a result of this merger.

Former districts of Ibaraki Prefecture